Åmot is a municipality in Innlandet county, Norway. It is located in the traditional district of Østerdalen. The administrative centre of the municipality is the village of Rena. Other villages in the municipality include Åsta, Osneset, and Snippen.

The  municipality is the 72nd largest by area out of the 356 municipalities in Norway. Åmot is the 198th most populous municipality in Norway with a population of 4,195.

General information
The parish of Aamot (later spelled Åmot) was established as a municipality on 1 January 1838 (see formannskapsdistrikt law). In 1880, the Nordre Osen area of Trysil (population: 302) was transferred to Åmot municipality.

Name
The municipality (originally the parish) is named after the old Åmot farm, since the first Åmot Church was built here. Thus the name means the meeting of the rivers (the confluence of the rivers Glomma and Rena is in Åmot). Prior to 1921, the name was written "Aamot".

Coat of arms
The coat of arms was granted on 26 February 1988. The arms show three gold or yellow timber axes on a green background. They symbolize the importance and history of the logging industry in the area.

Churches
The Church of Norway has three parishes within the municipality of Åmot. It is part of the Sør-Østerdal prosti (deanery) in the Diocese of Hamar.

Education
Åmot has four schools: Åmot Ungdomsskole (Åmot Lower secondary school), Rena Barneskole, Deset Oppvekstsenter, and Osen Oppvekstsenter.

Government
All municipalities in Norway, including Åmot, are responsible for primary education (through 10th grade), outpatient health services, senior citizen services, unemployment and other social services, zoning, economic development, and municipal roads. The municipality is governed by a municipal council of elected representatives, which in turn elects a mayor.  The municipality falls under the Østre Innlandet District Court and the Eidsivating Court of Appeal.

Municipal council
The municipal council  of Åmot is made up of 19 representatives that are elected to four year terms. The party breakdown of the council is as follows:

Mayor

The mayors of Åmot (incomplete list):
2003-2011: Ole Gustav Narud (Sp)
2011-2015: Espen André Kristiansen (Ap)
2015-2019: Ole Gustav Narud (Sp)
2019–present: Ole Erik Hørstad (H)

Geography
Åmot is located in the east-central part of Innlandet county. It is bordered to the north by the municipality of Rendalen, to the east by Trysil, to the south by Elverum, to the southwest by Hamar and Ringsaker, and in the west by Stor-Elvdal.

The Renaelva and Julussa rivers are both tributaries of the large river Glomma, all three of which flow through Åmot. The Kjøllsæter Bridge crosses the river Renaelva, just north of its confluence with the Julussa river. The Julussdalen valley follows the river Julussa through the municipality.

Notable people 

 Vilhelm Uchermann (1852 in Åmot – 1929) a physician, Norway's first otorhinolaryngologist
 Tollef Kilde (1853 in Åmot – 1947) a forest owner, politician and local Mayor ca.1900
 Hans Storhaug, MM, DSM (1915 in Rena – 1995) a Norwegian resistance member during WWII 
 Vidar Sandbeck (1918 in Åmot – 2005) a Norwegian folk singer, composer and writer
 Anne-Cath. Vestly (1920 in Rena – 2008) a Norwegian author of children's literature
 Ivar Nergaard (born 1964 in Rena) a Norwegian actor and writer 
 Stian Berget (born 1977 in Rena) a retired Norwegian footballer with almost 200 club caps
 Tuva Novotny (born 1979) a Swedish actress, director and singer; brought up in Åmot

References

External links

Municipal fact sheet from Statistics Norway 

 
Municipalities of Innlandet
1838 establishments in Norway